A list of the films produced in Mexico in 1950 (see 1950 in film):

1950

See also
1950 in Mexico

External links

1950
Films
Mexican